Kullo Must (18 March 1911 – 10 August 1987) was an Estonian film producer who worked extensively in Estonian language film production of the 1960s and 1970s.

He worked on the film Aeg elada, aeg armastada in 1976. His last film was Karge meri released in 1981.

Filmography
Karge meri (1981) (producer)
Tuulte pesa (1979) (producer)
Surma hinda küsi surnutelt (1977) (producer)
Aeg elada, aeg armastada (1976) (producer)
Röövpüüdjajaht (1975) (producer)
Indrek (1975) (producer)
Verekivi (1972) (producer)
Don Juan Tallinnas (1971) (producer)
Varastati Vana Toomas (1970) (producer)
Kevade (1969) (producer)
Libahunt (1968) (producer)
Keskpäevane praam (1967) (producer)
Null kolm (1965) (producer)
Supernoova (1965) (producer)
Ohtlikud kurvid (1961) (producer)
Ühe küla mehed (1961) (producer)
Vallatud kurvid (1959) (producer)
Esimese järgu kapten (1959) (producer)
Pöördel (1957) (producer)
Kui saabub õhtu (1955) (producer)

References

External links

Estonian film producers
1911 births
1987 deaths